The canton of La Fère is a former administrative division in northern France. It was disbanded following the French canton reorganisation which came into effect in March 2015. It consisted of 20 communes that joined the canton of Tergnier in 2015. It had 3,299 inhabitants (2012).

The canton comprised the following communes:

Achery
Andelain
Anguilcourt-le-Sart
Bertaucourt-Epourdon
Brie
Charmes
Courbes
Danizy
Deuillet
La Fère
Fourdrain
Fressancourt
Mayot
Monceau-lès-Leups
Rogécourt
Saint-Gobain
Saint-Nicolas-aux-Bois
Servais
Travecy
Versigny

Demographics

See also
Cantons of the Aisne department

References

Former cantons of Aisne
2015 disestablishments in France
States and territories disestablished in 2015